The ASK 16 was designed by Rudolf Kaiser for production by Alexander Schleicher GmbH & Co of Furth, Germany. The aircraft is of welded tube, wood and fabric construction and has a low-set high-aspect-ratio wing.

Seating is side-by-side for two persons under a fully transparent side-hinged canopy. The standard powerplant is a  Limbach L1700 driving a Hoffman variable-pitch propeller.

The ASK 16 has a retractable tail-wheel undercarriage with the main units mounted under the wings and retracting inwards. It is fitted with dual controls to permit use in the primary training role.

Production and operation

The prototype first flew on 2 February 1971 and a total of 44 aircraft were built for operation by clubs and private owners.  Most of the completed aircraft remained in active service in 2005, including examples flying in Germany, Ireland, Italy, Switzerland, and the United Kingdom.

Specifications

References

1970s German civil aircraft
Schleicher aircraft
Motor gliders
Single-engined tractor aircraft
Low-wing aircraft
Aircraft first flown in 1971